Ibrahim Sangaré (born 15 March 1994) is a French professional footballer who plays as a forward for  club Le Puy.

Career
Sangaré signed his first professional contract for Auxerre on 3 February 2017, having worked his way up in the lower French divisions with L'Entente SSG, Chambly, and Avranches. Sangaré made his professional debut for Auxerre in a 2–0 loss to US Orléans on 4 February 2017 in the Ligue 2.

Sangaré spent 18 months in Turkey with Giresunspor and Menemenspor from June 2018, returning to France to sign for Créteil in February 2020. He further signed for Orléans, and Le Puy Foot 43.

Personal life
Sangaré was born in France, and is of Ivorian descent.

References

External links
 
 
 
 Footmercato Profile

1994 births
French sportspeople of Ivorian descent
Sportspeople from Montreuil, Seine-Saint-Denis
Footballers from Seine-Saint-Denis
Living people
French footballers
Association football forwards
Entente SSG players
US Avranches players
AJ Auxerre players
Giresunspor footballers
Menemenspor footballers
US Créteil-Lusitanos players
US Orléans players
Le Puy Foot 43 Auvergne players
Ligue 2 players
Championnat National players
Championnat National 2 players
Championnat National 3 players
TFF First League players
French expatriate footballers
Expatriate footballers in Turkey
French expatriate sportspeople in Turkey